Krosnowice  (formerly Rankowo) is a village in the administrative district of Gmina Kłodzko, within Kłodzko County, Lower Silesian Voivodeship, in south-western Poland. Prior to 1945 it was in Germany.

The village has a population of 2,954.

Notable residents
 Dieter Damerius (born 1924), Wehrmacht officer 
 Georg Dörffel (1914–1944), Luftwaffe officer
 Robert Stein (1857-1917), Arctic explorer and translator of local native languages

References

Villages in Kłodzko County